Cascade Falls is a waterfall on the Iskut River in the Stikine Country of northwestern British Columbia, Canada, to the southeast of Mount Edziza and near the Stewart-Cassiar Highway.

See also
List of waterfalls of British Columbia

References

Stikine Country
Waterfalls of British Columbia